Willem-Alexander (Willem-Alexander Claus George Ferdinand; born ) is King of the Netherlands, having acceded to the throne following his mother's abdication in 2013.

Willem-Alexander was born in Utrecht as the oldest child of Princess Beatrix and diplomat Claus van Amsberg. He went to public primary and secondary schools in the Netherlands, an international sixth-form college in Wales, served in the Royal Netherlands Navy, and studied history at Leiden University. He married Máxima Zorreguieta Cerruti in 2002 and they have three daughters: Catharina-Amalia, Princess of Orange (born 2003), Princess Alexia (born 2005), and Princess Ariane (born 2007).

Willem-Alexander is interested in sports and international water management issues. Until his accession to the throne, he was a member of the International Olympic Committee (1998–2013), chairman of the Advisory Committee on Water to the Dutch Minister of Infrastructure and the Environment (2004–2013), and chairman of the Secretary-General of the United Nations' Advisory Board on Water and Sanitation (2006–2013).

Early life and education

He is the first child of Princess Beatrix and Prince Claus, and the first grandchild of Queen Juliana and Prince Bernhard. He was the first male Dutch royal baby since the birth of Prince Alexander in 1851, and the first immediate male heir since Alexander's death in 1884.

From birth, Willem-Alexander has held the titles Prince of the Netherlands, Prince of Orange-Nassau (Dutch: Prins van Oranje-Nassau), and Jonkheer of Amsberg (Dutch: Jonkheer van Amsberg). His godparents are his maternal grandfather Prince Bernhard of Lippe-Biesterfeld, his paternal grandmother Gösta Freiin von dem Bussche-Haddenhausen, Prince Ferdinand von Bismarck, former Prime Minister Jelle Zijlstra, Jonkvrouw Renée Röell, and Queen Margrethe II of Denmark.

He had two younger brothers: Prince Friso (1968–2013) and Prince Constantijn (born in 1969). He lived with his family at the castle Drakensteyn in the hamlet Lage Vuursche near Baarn from his birth until 1981, when they moved to the larger palace Huis ten Bosch in The Hague. His mother, Beatrix, became Queen of the Netherlands in 1980, after his grandmother Juliana abdicated. He then received the title of Prince of Orange as heir apparent to the throne of the Kingdom of the Netherlands at the age of 13.

Willem-Alexander attended local state primary school Nieuwe Baarnse Elementary School in Baarn from 1973 to 1979. He went to two different state secondary schools: the Baarns Lyceum in Baarn from 1979 to 1981 and the Eerste Vrijzinnig Christelijk Lyceum in The Hague from 1981 to 1983, and the private sixth-form college United World College of the Atlantic in Wales, the UK (1983 to 1985), from which he received his International Baccalaureate.

After his military service from 1985 to 1987, Willem-Alexander studied History at Leiden University from 1987 onwards and received his MA degree in 1993. His final thesis was on the Dutch response to France's decision under President Charles de Gaulle to leave the NATO's integrated command structure.

Willem-Alexander speaks English, Spanish, French and German (his father's native language, despite never getting German language lessons from him) fluently in addition to his native Dutch.

Military training and career

Between secondary school and his university education, Willem-Alexander performed military service in the Royal Netherlands Navy from August 1985 until January 1987. He received his training at the Royal Netherlands Naval College and the frigates HNLMS Tromp and HNLMS Abraham Crijnssen, where he was an ensign. In 1988 he received additional training at the ship HNLMS Van Kinsbergen and became a lieutenant (junior grade).

As a reservist for the Royal Netherlands Navy, Willem-Alexander was promoted to lieutenant commander in 1995, commander in 1997, Captain at Sea in 2001, and commodore in 2005. As a reservist for the Royal Netherlands Army, he was made a major (Grenadiers' and Rifles Guard Regiment) in 1995, and was promoted to lieutenant colonel in 1997, colonel in 2001, and brigadier general in 2005. As a reservist for the Royal Netherlands Air Force, he was made squadron leader in 1995 and promoted to air commodore in 2005. As a reservist for the Royal Marechaussee, he was made brigadier general in 2005.

Before his investiture as king in 2013, Willem-Alexander was honourably discharged from the armed forces. The government declared that the head of state cannot be a serving member of the armed forces, since the government itself holds supreme command over the armed forces. As king, Willem-Alexander may choose to wear a military uniform with royal insignia, but not with his former rank insignia.

Activities and social interests

Since 1985, when he became 18 years old, Willem-Alexander has been a member of the Council of State of the Netherlands. This is the highest council of the Dutch government and is chaired by the head of state (then Queen Beatrix).

Willem-Alexander is interested in water management and sports issues. He was an honorary member of the World Commission on Water for the 21st century and patron of the Global Water Partnership, a body established by the World Bank, the UN, and the Swedish Ministry of Development.

On 10 October 2010, Willem-Alexander and Máxima went to the Netherlands Antilles' capital, Willemstad, to attend and represent his mother, the Queen, at the Antillean Dissolution ceremony.

He was a patron of the Dutch Olympic Games Committee until 1998 when he was made a member of the International Olympic Committee (IOC). After becoming King, he relinquished his membership and received the Gold Olympic Order at the 125th IOC Session. To celebrate the 100th anniversary of the 1928 Summer Olympics held in Amsterdam, he had expressed support to bid for the 2028 Summer Olympics.

Reign 

On , Beatrix announced her intention of abdicating. Later that afternoon, Willem-Alexander was inaugurated as king in front of the joint assembly of the States General in a ceremony held at the Nieuwe Kerk.

As king, Willem-Alexander has weekly meetings with the prime minister and speaks regularly with ministers and state secretaries. He also signs all new Acts of Parliament and royal decrees. He represents the kingdom at home and abroad. At the State Opening of Parliament, he delivers the Speech from the Throne, which announces the plans of the government for the parliamentary year. The Constitution requires that the king appoint, dismiss and swear in all government ministers and state secretaries. As king, he is also the President of the Council of State, an advisory body that reviews proposed legislation.  In modern practice, the monarch seldom chairs council meetings.

At his accession at age 46, he was Europe's youngest monarch. He is also the first male monarch of the Netherlands since the death of his great-great-grandfather William III in 1890. Willem-Alexander was one of four new monarchs to take the throne in 2013 along with Pope Francis, the Emir Tamim bin Hamad of Qatar, and King Philippe of Belgium.

Other activities

Willem-Alexander is an avid pilot and has said that if he had not been a royal, he would have liked to be an airline pilot so he could fly internationally on large-sized aircraft such as the Boeing 747. During the reign of his mother, he regularly flew the Dutch royal aircraft on trips. However, in May 2017, Willem-Alexander revealed that he had served as a first officer on KLM flights for 21 years, flying KLM Cityhopper's Fokker 70s twice a month, even after his accession to the throne. Following KLM's phased retirement of the Fokker 70, he began training to fly Boeing 737s. Willem-Alexander was rarely recognized while in the KLM uniform and wearing the KLM cap, though a few passengers recognized his voice, even though he never gave his name and only welcomed passengers on behalf of the captain and crew.

Using the name "W. A. van Buren", one of the least-known titles of the House of Orange-Nassau, he participated in the 1986 Frisian Elfstedentocht, a  distance ice skating tour. He ran the New York City Marathon under the same pseudonym in 1992. Willem-Alexander completed both events.

Marriage and children

On 2 February 2002, he married Máxima Zorreguieta Cerruti at the Nieuwe Kerk in Amsterdam. The marriage triggered significant controversy due to the role the bride's father, Jorge Zorreguieta, had in the Argentinian military dictatorship. The couple have three daughters: The Princess of Orange, Princess Alexia, and Princess Ariane.

Privacy and the press 
 Photographs of the members of the royal house while performing their duties are always permitted.
 For other occasions (like holidays or vacations), the RVD will arrange a photo-op on condition that the press leave the family alone for the rest of the activity.

During a ski vacation in Argentina, several photographs were taken of the prince and his family during the private part of their holiday, including one by Associated Press staff photographer Natacha Pisarenko, in spite of the media code, and after a photo opportunity had been provided earlier. The Associated Press decided to publish some of the photos, which were subsequently republished by several Dutch media. On , the district court ruled in favour of the prince and RVD, citing that the couple has a right to privacy, that the pictures in question add nothing to any public debate, and that they are not of any particular value to society since they are not photographs of his family "at work". Associated Press was sentenced to stop further publication of the photographs, on pain of a  fine per violation with a  maximum.

Properties
From 2003 until 2019, Willem-Alexander and his family lived in Villa Eikenhorst on the De Horsten Estate in Wassenaar. After his mother abdicated and became Princess Beatrix once again, she moved to the castle of Drakensteyn, after which the King and his family moved to the newly renovated monarch's palace of Huis ten Bosch in The Hague in 2019.

Willem-Alexander has a villa near Kranidi, Greece.

Villa in Machangulo
On 10 July 2008, the Prince of Orange and Princess Maxima announced that they had invested in a development project on the Mozambican peninsula of Machangulo. The development project was aimed at building an ecologically responsible vacation resort, including a hotel and several luxury holiday homes for investors. The project was to invest heavily in the local economy of the peninsula (building schools and a local clinic) with an eye both towards responsible sustainability and maintaining a local staff. After contacting Mozambican President Armando Guebuza to verify that the Mozambican government had no objections, the couple decided to invest in two villas. In 2009, controversy erupted in parliament and the press about the project and the prince's involvement. Politician Alexander Pechtold questioned the morality of building such a resort in a poor country like Mozambique. After public and parliamentary controversy, the royal couple announced that they had decided to sell the property in Machangulo once their house was completed. In January 2012, it was confirmed that the villa had been sold.

Titles, styles, honours and arms

Titles and styles

 : His Royal Highness Prince Willem-Alexander of the Netherlands, Prince of Orange-Nassau, Jonkheer van Amsberg
 : His Royal Highness The Prince of Orange
 present: His Majesty The King of the Netherlands

Willem-Alexander is the first Dutch king since Willem III ( 1890). Willem-Alexander had earlier indicated that when he became king, he would take the name Willem IV, but it was announced in January 2013 that his regnal name would be Willem-Alexander.

Military ranks

Royal Netherlands Navy – conscripted
  Lieutenant at sea, third class (Ensign) (August 1985January 1987)
  Lieutenant at sea, second class (Sub-lieutenant) (watch officer, 1988)

Royal Netherlands Navy – reserve
 Lieutenant at sea, second class (senior grade) (Lieutenant) (1988–1995)
 Lieutenant at sea, first class (Lieutenant Commander) (1995–1997)
 Captain-lieutenant at sea (Commander) (1997–2001)
 Captain at Sea (2001–2005)
 Commodore (2005–2013)

Royal Netherlands Air Force – reserve
 Squadron Leader (1995–2005)
 Air Commodore (2005–2013)Royal Netherlands Army – reserve Major, Grenadiers' and Rifles Guard Regiment (1995–1997)
 Lieutenant Colonel (1997–2001)
 Colonel (2001–2005)
 Brigadier General (2005–2013)Royal Marechaussee – reserve Brigadier General (2005–2013)King's Insignia, all services'''
  Royal insignia as King (2013–present)

Qualifications
 Military Pilot

Honours

National
  Grand Master of the Military William Order
  Grand Master and Knight Grand Cross of the Order of the Netherlands Lion
  Grand Master of the Order of Orange-Nassau
  Co-Grand Master and Knight of the Order of the Gold Lion of the House of Nassau
  Grand Master and Grand Cross of the Order of the House of Orange
  Grand Master of the Order of the Crown
  Grand Master of the Order for Loyalty and Merit
  Honorary Commander of the Order of Saint John in the Netherlands
  Grand Master of the Order of the Golden Ark
  Recipient of the Eleven Cities Cross
  Recipient of the 
  Recipient of the Queen Beatrix Inauguration Medal
  Recipient of the Wedding Medal of Prince Willem-Alexander to Maxima Zorruigeta

Foreign
: Collar of the Order of the Liberator General San Martín
: Grand Star of the Decoration of Honour for Services to the Republic of Austria 
:
 Grand Cordon of the Order of Leopold (2016)
 Grand Cross of the Order of the Crown (1993)
: Grand Cross of the Order of the Southern Cross
: Member 1st Class of the Family Order of Laila Utama
: Member 1st Class of the Amílcar Cabral Order
: Grand Cross of the Order of the Merit
: Knight of the Order of the Elephant
: Collar with Star of the Order of the Cross of Terra Mariana
:
 Grand Cross of the Order of the Legion of Honour
 Grand Cross of the National Order of Merit
: 
 Grand Cross First class of the Order of Merit of the Federal Republic of Germany
 Grand Cross Special Class of the Order of Merit of the Federal Republic of Germany
 : Grand Cross of the Order of the Redeemer (31 October 2022)
: Star of Mahaputera 1st Class
: Knight Grand Cross with Collar of the Order of Merit of the Italian Republic
: Grand Cordon with Collar of the Order of the Chrysanthemum
: Commander Grand Cross with Chain 1st Class of the Order of the Three Stars
: Grand Cross with Golden Chain of the Order of Vytautas the Great
:
 Grand Cross of the Order of Adolphe of Nassau
 Grand Cross of the Order of the Oak Crown
: Sash of the Order of the Aztec Eagle (2009)
: Grand Cross with Collar of the Order of St. Olav (1996) (2021)
: Member Special Class of the Order of Oman
: Knight of the Order of the White Eagle
: Grand Collar of the Order of Prince Henry
: Grand Cross of the Order of the White Double Cross (7 March 2023)
: Knight Grand Cross of the Order of Isabella the Catholic
: Knight with Collar of the Royal Order of the Seraphim (2022)
: Knight Grand Cordon of the Order of Chula Chom Klao
: Grand Cross of the Order of Union
: Stranger Knight of the Order of the Garter
: Grand Cross of the Order of the Liberator

Awards
 International Olympic Committee: Recipient of the Gold Olympic Order

Honorary appointment
Aide-de-camp to Her Majesty The Queen (until 2013)

Arms

Ancestry
Through his father, a member of the House of Amsberg, he is descended from families of the lower German nobility, and through his mother, from several royal German–Dutch families such as the House of Lippe, Mecklenburg-Schwerin, the House of Orange-Nassau, Waldeck and Pyrmont, and the House of Hohenzollern. He is descended from the first king of the Netherlands, William I of the Netherlands, who was also a ruler in Luxembourg and several German states, and all subsequent Dutch monarchs.

Through his mother, Willem-Alexander also descends from Paul I of Russia and thus from German princess Catherine the Great and Swedish King Gustav I. Through his father, he is also descended from several Dutch–Flemish families who left the Low Countries during Spanish rule, such as the Berenbergs. His paternal great-great-grandfather Gabriel von Amsberg, a major-general of Mecklenburg, was recognized as noble as late as 1891, the family having adopted the "von" in 1795.

Willem-Alexander is a descendant of King George II and, more relevant for his succession rights, of his granddaughter Princess Augusta of Great Britain. Under the British Act of Settlement, King Willem-Alexander temporarily forfeited his (distant) succession rights to the throne of the United Kingdom by marrying a Roman Catholic. This right has since been restored in 2015 under the Succession to the Crown Act 2013.

References

External links 

  (English)
 Official website (Dutch)
 

1967 births
Amsberg
Collars of the Order of the Liberator General San Martin
Dutch aviators
Dutch monarchs
Dutch people of German descent
Extra Knights Companion of the Garter
Grand Collars of the Order of Prince Henry
Grand Crosses Special Class of the Order of Merit of the Federal Republic of Germany
Grand Crosses with Golden Chain of the Order of Vytautas the Great
House of Orange-Nassau
International Olympic Committee members
Jonkheers of Amsberg
Knights Grand Cordon of the Order of Chula Chom Klao
Knights Grand Cross of the Order of Isabella the Catholic
Knights Grand Cross with Collar of the Order of Merit of the Italian Republic
Leiden University alumni
Living people
Members of the Council of State (Netherlands)
People educated at a United World College
People educated at Atlantic College
People from Utrecht (city)
People from Wassenaar
Princes of Orange-Nassau
Princes of Orange
Protestant Church Christians from the Netherlands
Protestant monarchs
Recipients of the Collar of the Order of the Cross of Terra Mariana
Recipients of the Cross of Recognition
Recipients of the Olympic Order
Recipients of the Order of the Netherlands Lion
Royal Netherlands Navy officers